Heteraster is an extinct  genus of sea urchins belonging to the family Toxasteridae.

These slow-moving shallow infaunal deposit feeder-detritivores lived during the Cretaceous period. Fossils of this family have been found in the sediments of Algeria, Egypt, France, Hungary, Mexico, Peru, Portugal, Serbia and Montenegro, Spain, Switzerland and Yemen.

Species
Heteraster oblongus Brongniart, 1821 
Heteraster delgadoi (Loriol, 1888)
Heteraster renevieri (Desor, 1858).
Heteraster  transiens Devries (1956)
Heteraster  tissoti Coquand
Heteraster peroni Ficheur
Heteraster castellon

References

Spatangoida
Cretaceous echinoderms
Cretaceous animals of Africa
Fossil taxa described in 1855
Fossils of Serbia
Prehistoric echinoderms of Africa